Aver See is a lake in the Mecklenburgische Seenplatte district in Mecklenburg-Vorpommern, Germany.

References 

Lakes of Mecklenburg-Western Pomerania